Sheela Gautam  (15 November 1931 – 8 June 2019) was an Indian billionaire politician and businesswoman. She was the founder and owner of Sheela Foam Limited, run by her son Rahul Gautam, which sells mattresses under the Sleepwell brand among others. A member of the Bharatiya Janta Party she served in the 10th, 11th, 12th & 13th Lok Sabhas of India. She represented the Aligarh Lok Sabha constituency of Uttar Pradesh for 13 years in row from June 1991 to May 2004. She is the daughter of the famous freedom fighter Late Mohan Lal Gautam.

12   pass

Early life and education 
Sheela Gautam was born in a brahmin family at gabhana Aligarh district. Her parents were Indian freedom activist Pt. Mohan Lal Gautam and Smt. Draupadi Gautam. At that time, the British Raj occupied India so she spent her life in several places. She got a B.A., B.Ed., and diploma in management from Lucknow University, Lucknow (Uttar Pradesh).

Marriage
She married Lt. Col. H.S. Gautam who died of cancer.

Political career
She joined politics with the Indian National Congress but resigned and joined the Bharatiya Janata Party. She held the post of MP continuously from 1991 through 2004 as a member of the 10th, 11th, 12th & 13th Lok Sabha. She is the record longest-serving Lok Sabha MP from Aligarh Lok Sabha constituency. 
In May 2004 elections she lost to Indian National Congress candidate Bijendra Singh by a margin of 2800 votes.

References 

India MPs 1991–1996
India MPs 1996–1997
India MPs 1998–1999
India MPs 1999–2004
Bharatiya Janata Party politicians from Uttar Pradesh
People from Aligarh district
1931 births
2019 deaths
Lok Sabha members from Uttar Pradesh
Women in Uttar Pradesh politics
20th-century Indian women politicians
20th-century Indian politicians
21st-century Indian women politicians
21st-century Indian politicians
Politicians from Allahabad